Sumbas is a town and district of Osmaniye Province in the Mediterranean region of Turkey.

In 2022, during infrastructure work, a marble statue of Virgin Mary was found dated back to the Roman period.

References

External links
 District governor's official website 

Populated places in Osmaniye Province
Districts of Osmaniye Province
Towns in Turkey
Sumbas District